Eagle Mountain is a  mountain summit located immediately northeast of the Banff Sunshine ski resort in Banff National Park of Alberta, Canada. The mountain's toponym was officially adopted in 1958 by the Geographical Names Board of Canada. The nearest higher neighbor is Mount Howard Douglas,  to the south-southeast.

An interesting feature of Eagle Mountain is a natural window officially named Goat's Eye located on the northeast ridge which leads many to call it Goat's Eye Mountain. It was first noted by George Simpson who wrote of it: "a very peculiar feature in an opening of about eighty feet by fifty, which, as we advanced nearer, assumed the appearance of the gateway of a giant's fortress."

Geology

Like other mountains in Banff Park, Eagle Mountain is composed of sedimentary rock laid down from the Precambrian to Jurassic periods. Formed in shallow seas, this sedimentary rock was pushed east and over the top of younger rock during the Laramide orogeny.

Climate

Based on the Köppen climate classification, Eagle Mountain is located in a subarctic climate zone with cold, snowy winters, and mild summers. Winter temperatures can drop below -20 °C with wind chill factors below -30 °C. Precipitation runoff from Eagle Mountain drains into tributaries of the Bow River.

Gallery

See also
Geography of Alberta

References

External links
 Parks Canada web site: Banff National Park

Canadian Rockies
Two-thousanders of Alberta
Mountains of Banff National Park
Alberta's Rockies